The Local Government etc. (Scotland) Act 1994 (c. 39) is an Act of the Parliament of the United Kingdom that created the current local government structure of 32 unitary authorities covering the whole of Scotland.

It abolished the two-tier structure of regions and districts created by the Local Government (Scotland) Act 1973 which had previously covered Scotland except for the islands council areas.

The Act came into effect on 1 April 1996, beginning with the 1995 Scottish local elections.

Initial proposals 
The Secretary of State for Scotland, Ian Lang outlined proposed areas in a statement to the Commons on 8 July 1993.  This outlined 25 unitary authorities (apart from the 3 Island Areas), as follows

 City of Aberdeen: existing Aberdeen District plus Westhill area of Gordon District
 Aberdeenshire: Banff and Buchan District, Gordon District less Westhill area, Kincardine and Deeside District less southern part of former County of Kincardineshire
 Angus and Mearns: Angus District, the Monifieth and Sidlaw areas of Dundee District and the southern part of former County of Kincardineshire from Kincardine and Deeside District less
 Argyll and Bute: Argyll and Bute District, western part of Dumbarton District (including Helensburgh)
 Berwickshire and East Lothian: Berwickshire District, East Lothian District less Musselburgh/Fisherrow, Preston/Levenhall areas
 The Borders: Tweeddale District, Ettrick and Lauderdale District, Roxburgh District
 Clackmannan and Falkirk: Clackmannan District, Falkirk District, Kincardine Bridge area of Dunfermline District
 Dumbarton and Clydebank: Clydebank District, Dumbarton District (less Helensburgh area)
 Dumfries and Galloway: Dumfries and Galloway Region
 City of Dundee: Dundee District less Monifieth and Sidlaw areas
 City of Edinburgh: Edinburgh District
 East Dunbartonshire: Bearsden and Milngavie District, Strathkelvin District less area around Chryston formerly in the county of Lanarkshire
 East Renfrewshire: Eastwood District, and the Barrhead area and Paisley suburbs in East Renfrewshire constituency from Renfrew District
 Fife: Fife Region
 City of Glasgow: Glasgow District less Toryglen/King's Park, Rutherglen/Fernhill and Cambuslang/Halfway areas
Highland: Highland Region
The Lothians: Midlothian District, West Lothian District, the Musselburgh/Fisherrow, Preston/Levenhall areas of East Lothian District
Moray: Moray District
North Ayrshire: Cunninghame District, Cumnock and Doon Valley District, Kilmarnock and Loudoun District
North Lanarkshire: Cumbernauld and Kilsyth District, Monklands District, Motherwell District, the area around Chryston formerly in the county of Lanarkshire from Strathkelvin District
Perthshire and Kinross: Perth and Kinross District
South Ayrshire: Kyle and Carrick District
South Lanarkshire: Clydesdale District, Hamilton District, East Kilbride District, the Toryglen/King's Park, Rutherglen/Fernhill and Cambuslang/Halfway areas from Glasgow District
Stirling: Stirling District
West Renfrewshire: Inverclyde District, Renfrew District less the Barrhead area and Paisley suburbs in East Renfrewshire constituency

New local government areas 

Schedule I of the Act defined the new local government areas in terms of the existing districts and regions. Islands council areas had been unitary council areas since implementation of the 1973 Act, and Section 3 of the 1994 Act provided that the existing islands areas were to continue to be local government areas.

Area councils 
Each area established by the Act was to be governed by an elected council.  The council's title was simply the name of the area followed by the word "Council": Argyll and Bute Council, Aberdeen City Council and so on.  Each area was divided into wards with each ward returning a single councillor.  The councillors were required to elect a convener, and could choose to elect a deputy convener.  In the four city areas (Aberdeen, Dundee, Edinburgh and Glasgow) the convener's title was to be Lord Provost.  In the other council areas the convener was to be "known by such title as the council may determine", other than Lord Provost. In 1998 sixteen councils were using the title "provost", the remaining twelve having conveners.

Area councils were obliged to make a draft decentralisation scheme by 1 April 1997. The scheme could provide for:
 The holding of meetings of the council (or any committee or sub-committee) at particular places within the council area
 The establishment of committees for particular areas and the delegation to them of specified functions
 The location of council offices within the area
 The provision of facilities for accessing advice on council services at particular places within the council area
The plan was to include dates at which the various proposals were to be carried out.  Having made the draft plan there was to be an eight-week period in which the area council was to consult with the relevant community councils and invite the public to make observations. The decentralisation scheme could then be adopted in original or modified form.

Community councils 
Community councils established by district councils under the 1973 Act were to continue to exist.  The area councils took on the powers of the abolished districts to make or amend schemes for the establishment of communities.

Water supply and sewerage 
Part II of the Act reorganised water supply and sewerage services, previously the responsibility of regional councils.  Three water authorities were established, each with a defined water area and sewerage area (which were not necessarily identical). The water and sewerage areas were defined in schedule 8, as follows:

The Act also established a Scottish Water and Sewerage Customers Council. The three water authorities were merged in 2002 to form Scottish Water.

Other functions 
The reorganisation of local government areas also led to changes in policing, fire services, public transport and tourism promotion.  These had been organised in 1975 to correspond to one or more regions.
 The Police (Scotland) Act 1967 was amended to allow for the reconstitution of police areas and appointment of joint authorities.
 Similarly fire services and authorities were reconstituted.
 The Secretary of State for Scotland was to designate an area and constitution for the Strathclyde Passenger Transport Authority.
 Area Tourist Boards were to be established by the Secretary of State.
 Civic Licensing – the Civic Government (Scotland) Act 1982 introduced a codified framework of regulation of activities such as taxis, street traders, public entertainment and so on. After the introduction of the 1994 Act, the "licensing authority" became the new unitary council for each area.

See also
Subdivisions of Scotland

Notes and references

External links
Full text of the act, on legislation.gov.uk

United Kingdom Acts of Parliament 1994
Acts of the Parliament of the United Kingdom concerning Scotland
Local government in Scotland
 
1994 in Scotland
Local government legislation in the United Kingdom